The Prix Giles (also known as the Prix Hérbert Allen Giles) is awarded biennially for a work related to China, Japan or East Asia that was published in the previous two years by a French author. It is named after the British sinologist Herbert Giles, and is awarded by the Académie des Inscriptions et Belles-Lettres. The prize was established in 1917 and was funded by Herbert Giles himself. The first award was given in 1919.

Prize winners

See also
 Prix Stanislas Julien, awarded annually for a sinological work usually published in the previous year

References 

Academic awards
Sinology
French awards
Awards established in 1917